The East Somerset Railway is a  heritage railway in Somerset, running between Cranmore and Mendip Vale. The railway was once part of the former Cheddar Valley line that ran from Witham to Yatton, meeting the Somerset and Dorset Joint Railway at Wells but was considered for closure even before the publication of 'The Reshaping of British Railways' by Dr Richard Beeching in March 1963.

History 
The East Somerset Railway Company was incorporated under the East Somerset Railway Act on 5 June 1856 and was built as a  broad gauge line. The line was originally between Witham railway station and Shepton Mallet and this line opened on 9 November 1858. It was planned by Mr. Brunel and built by engineer Mr. Ward and contractor Mr. Brotherwood. The station buildings at Shepton and Witham Friary, as well as the bridges along the route, were constructed of Inferior Oolite from nearby Doulting Stone Quarry. Shepton was now  from London by rail, a journey of just over four hours.

Four years later the line was extended to Wells.

In 1878, the GWR joined the East Somerset line with the Cheddar Valley line to Wells, which had been built by the Bristol and Exeter Railway, by obtaining running rights over a section of the Somerset and Dorset Joint Railway and running its trains through the S&DJR Wells station at Priory Road, though GWR trains did not stop at Priory Road until 1934. At this stage, the main traffic became the through trains from Yatton to Witham and the East Somerset Railway station in Wells closed, with Wells (Tucker Street) becoming the station for the city on the line. The Yatton to Witham service remained in use with the GWR and later BR until passenger service finally ceased on 7 September 1963, however trains carrying bitumen continued until 1985.

Preservation 
In 1971/72, the artist David Shepherd came across, viewed and later purchased Cranmore station and a section of the track to house and run his two locomotives; the BR 2-10-0 Class 9F No. 92203 "Black Prince" and BR Standard 4 4-6-0 No. 75029 'The Green Knight'. In 1973, the line opened offering Brake Van rides before extending first to Merryfield Lane in 1980 (operating from Cranmore West), then to Mendip Vale and finally into Cranmore station itself in 1985.

Today the railway plays host to a variety of preserved diesel and steam locomotives.

The East Somerset Railway only operates the line between Cranmore, Cranmore West, Merryfield Lane Halt and Mendip Vale. Between the last two sections, the railway runs through the Doulting Railway Cutting Site of Special Scientific Interest. The section between Cranmore and the mainline is used for heavy quarry traffic to the nearby Merehead Quarry.

In 1991, a new station building was constructed at Cranmore which now includes a cafe, booking office, gift shop and toilets. The platform then extends to the old station which is now a museum. On the platform is an old K4 red telephone box which incorporates a stamp machine and post box. It was made around 1927 and is one of only 50 made to that design. Opposite the platform is a signal box dating from 1904 and is the standard GWR pattern of the period. Close to Cranmore station are the engine sheds and workshop (known together as Cranmore Shed) which were built in 1973, (during the preserved line's restoration at the time).

Cranmore Traincare and Maintenance and Services (CTMS) was set up in 1995 at the Cranmore base of the ESR. They carry out professional repairs to carriages and bodywork overhauls on Diesel Locomotives. CTMS is based opposite the ESR loco workshop in a separate preservation era shed.

An order by the Secretary of State for Transport in 2005 allowed a further 660 yards (600 metres) of track to be used.

On 25 March 2007, the East Somerset Railway announced that it had received a £7,500 grant from Shepton 21 Group, a local organisation, set up to regenerate the area around Shepton Mallet. The money was to be spent on conducting a feasibility study into extending the line towards Shepton Mallet, with a possible new terminus at Cannards Grave, on the outskirts of Shepton Mallet.

Locomotives

Operational steam locomotives 

Former resident locomotives include 56xx 5637, 9F 92203 "Black Prince", Standard 4MT  75029 The Green Knight, Standard 4MT  76017, GWR Castle 5029 Nunney Castle, SR Westcountry 34027 'Taw Valley', SR West Country 34105 Swanage, SR S15 828, GWR Manor 7822 Foxcote Manor, GWR 14xx 1450, LBSCR E1 110, LMS 3F 47493, NER J72 69023 'Joem' and GNR J52 68846.

Steam locomotives under overhaul 

In recent years, the ESR workshops have restored several locomotives belonging to other railways such as LMS Ivatt Class 2 2-6-2T 41313 in 2017 and fellow Ivatt 46447 in 2014 for the Isle of Wight Steam Railway. GWR 5205 Class 5239 Goliath was completed for the Dartmouth Steam Railway in November 2019.

Diesel traction

The ESR is host to a Class 108 DMU as well as a fleet of Sentinel shunting locomotives, these are listed below:

Features 

References

Further reading

External links 

 

Heritage railways in Somerset
7 ft gauge railways
Railway companies established in 1856
Railway lines opened in 1858
Railway companies disestablished in 1874
Museums in Somerset
Railway museums in England
Rail transport in Somerset
British companies established in 1856
British companies disestablished in 1874